Eglė Jurgaitytė (born 24 January 1998, in Vilnius) is a Lithuanian singer and radio presenter. Jurgaitytė represented Lithuania at Junior Eurovision Song Contest 2008 where she finished in 3rd place.

Career
She started her singer career in 2002 when she was just four years old. In 2007 and 2008 Jurgaitytė participated at Lithuanian National Radio and Television talent show, Mažųjų žvaigždžių ringas 3", and reached final.

In 2008 she won national Lithuanian selection for Junior Eurovision Song Contest 2008 and represented Lithuania in the contest. In the final, she sang her song "Laiminga diena" and reached 3rd place.

In 2010, she participated in TV3 project "Chorų karai" (Lithuanian format of "Clash of the Choirs") where she was leader of second capital city choir of Vilnius. Jurgaitytė's producer is famous N.E.O. vocalist Raigardas Tautkus.

In 2018 she participated in the Lithuanian edition of The Voice and finished second.

As of 2021, Jurgaitytė presents a basketball themed radio programme, Žalgiris“ and a morning show on ZIP FM.

As of 2022, Jurgaitytė presents a web series "Tiek žinių" on YouTube TV channel "Laisvės TV" ("Freedom TV").

See also
 Lithuania in the Junior Eurovision Song Contest
 Junior Eurovision Song Contest 2008

References 

21st-century Lithuanian women singers
Lithuanian radio personalities
Lithuanian child singers
Living people
Junior Eurovision Song Contest entrants
1998 births
Musicians from Vilnius
News YouTubers